Claude Petit (9 January 1871, Sidi Bel Abbès - 9 November 1966) was a French politician. He represented the Republican-Socialist Party in the Chamber of Deputies from 1919 to 1928.

References

1871 births
1966 deaths
People from Sidi Bel Abbès
People of French Algeria
Pieds-Noirs
Republican-Socialist Party politicians
Members of the 12th Chamber of Deputies of the French Third Republic
Members of the 13th Chamber of Deputies of the French Third Republic